Laurent Frayssinous (born 7 May 1977) is a French professional rugby league coach who is the head coach of  and former professional rugby league footballer.

He played for the Catalans Dragons in the Super League and France at international level. He coached Les Catalans in the Betfred Super League. He was due to take control of the Ottawa Aces before the club withdrew from the English pyramid.

Playing career
He represented France in the halves in the 2000 World Cup. He also played in a match against the touring Australian Kangaroos at the end of the 2005 season, scoring a try and kicking two goals. Frayssinous played for Catalans Dragons when they reached the quarter finals of the 2006 Challenge Cup.

Coaching career
At the end of the 2012 season, Laurent Frayssinous was appointed head coach of the Catalans Dragons on a two-year contract, replacing Trent Robinson, who had left to coach the Sydney Roosters. At 35, he was the youngest coach in the Super League at the time, and the first French coach of the Perpignan-based club. On 22 May 2017, after a 10-18 defeat by the Huddersfield Giants, he was dismissed by the board of directors at the club. On 2 July 2020, Frayssinous was appointed as the first head coach of the Ottawa Aces for their inaugural season in RFL League 1 in 2021.

References

External links
France profile

1977 births
Living people
Catalans Dragons coaches
Catalans Dragons players
France national rugby league team coaches
France national rugby league team players
French rugby league coaches
French rugby league players
People from Villeneuve-sur-Lot
Rugby league five-eighths
Sportspeople from Lot-et-Garonne
Villeneuve Leopards players